Actaeomorpha is a genus of crabs in the family Aethridae, containing the following species:
 Actaeomorpha alvae Boone, 1934
 Actaeomorpha erosa Miers, 1877
 Actaeomorpha punctata Edmondson, 1935
 Actaeomorpha angulata Ihle, 1918
 Actaeomorpha lapillula Alcock, 1896
 Actaeomorpha morum Alcock, 1896

References

Crabs